The  was an unsuccessful attempt by Nakajima Aircraft Company to meet a 1935 requirement issued by the Japanese government for a modern single-seat monoplane fighter suitable to meet the needs of both the Imperial Japanese Army Air Force and Imperial Japanese Navy Air Service

Design and development
Development of the Ki-11 began as a private venture in 1934, based on a wire-braced low-wing monoplane, inspired by the Boeing P-26 Peashooter. The fuselage wing center section and undercarriage were constructed in duralumin, while the wings and tail were of wood and canvas. The aircraft was powered by a single  Nakajima Kotobuki Ha-1-3 radial engine. Proposed armament consisted of twin 7.7 mm (.303 in) machine guns firing from between the engine cylinders.

The Ki-11 was entered into competition with the Kawasaki Ki-10 biplane design. Although technically more advanced and faster than the Kawasaki design, the Imperial Japanese Army command was split between supporters of "maneuverability" and supporters of "speed". The supporters of the "maneuverability" scheme won, and the Ki-10 became the main army fighter until 1937. Nakajima continued to refine the Ki-11 design, and it re-emerged in the form of the Nakajima Ki-27 "Nate" several years later.

Nakajima later sold the fourth prototype as AN-1 Communications Aircraft to the Asahi Shimbun newspaper, who registered it as J-BBHA and used it as a liaison and courier plane, and for reconnaissance and news-gathering flights.

Variants
 Nakajima Ki-11
 initial prototype (4 built); #4 with enclosed cockpit

Operators
Asahi Shimbun

Specifications (Ki-11)

See also

References

Citations

Bibliography

External links

 Russian site

Low-wing aircraft
Ki-11, Nakajima
1930s Japanese experimental aircraft
Abandoned military aircraft projects of Japan
Ki-011
Single-engined tractor aircraft